Steven Henning "Steve" Warnstadt (born August 2, 1967) was the Iowa State Senator from the 1st District. A Democrat, he has served in the Iowa Senate from 2003 until 2011.  He received his BA from Drake University and his MA from Temple University, and is serving as an adjunct instructor with Western Iowa Tech Community College and as an intelligence officer with the Iowa Army National Guard.

Warnstadt served on several committees in the Iowa Senate: the Appropriations committee; the Judiciary committee; the Transportation committee; the Veterans Affairs committee, where he is vice chair; and the Commerce committee, where he is chair. He also serves as vice-chair of the Transportation, Infrastructure, and Capitals Appropriations Subcommittee. His prior political experience includes serving as a representative in the Iowa House from 1995 to 2003, serving on the Woodbury County Democratic Central Committee in 1996, and serving as president of the Drake College Democrats from 1987 to 1988.

Warnstadt did not seek re-election in 2010.

Electoral history
*incumbent

References

External links

 
Senator Steve Warnstadt official Iowa Legislature site
 Senator Steve Warnstadt official Iowa General Assembly site
State Senator Steve Warnstadt official constituency site
 
Steve Warnstadt Reflects on 16 Years in Office, Erika Thomas, KMEG14, March 31, 2010

1967 births
Living people
Democratic Party Iowa state senators
Democratic Party members of the Iowa House of Representatives
Drake University alumni
Temple University alumni
Educators from Iowa
College Democrats
Politicians from Sioux City, Iowa
National Guard (United States) officers
Military personnel from Iowa